Jorge Meana (born 27 December 1938) is an Argentine rower. He competed in the men's coxless four event at the 1964 Summer Olympics.

References

1938 births
Living people
Argentine male rowers
Olympic rowers of Argentina
Rowers at the 1964 Summer Olympics
Place of birth missing (living people)